Aníbal Kerpel is an Argentine producer, engineer an mixer. Member of the progressive rock band Crucis, he began a successful career as a producer after the split of the band, working with artists such as Los Prisioneros, Café Tacvba, Divididos, Molotov, Gustavo Santaolalla, Bersuit Vergarabat, Juanes and Árbol, among others. During his career he has received a Grammy Award and over ten Latin Grammy Awards.

Career
Kerpel was one of the members of the progressive rock band Crucis, playing the keyboards. The band released two studio albums, Crucis in 1976 and Los Delirios del Mariscal in 1977, before splitting in 1977. After the end of the band, Kerpel began working as producer for various artists, many times co-producing with Argentine musician Gustavo  Santaolalla. In 1985, he worked as assistant producer on the album De Ushuaia a La Quiaca by León Gieco. The project was produced by Santaolalla and recorded in various parts of Argentina. 

In 1990, he produced Corazones alongside Santaolalla, the fourth studio album by Chilean band Los Prisioneros. The album was recorded in California and included some of the band's most famous songs like "Estrechez de Corazón" and "Tren al Sur". In 1992, Kerpel participated as associate producer on the debut album by Mexican band Café Tacvba, also known as Café Tacuba. This would be the first of many collaborations with the band. During the 1990s, Kerpel worked as engineer and assistant producer on many albums including La Era de la Boludez by Divididos, the self-titled debut solo album by Jorge González, Re, Avalancha de Éxitos and Revés/Yo Soy by Café Tacvba and ¿Dónde Jugarán las Niñas? by Molotov. In 1997, Kerpel founded Surco Records with Santaolalla, a record label in conjunction with Universal Music.

In 2000, he worked as engineer on Fijate Bien, the debut studio album by Colombian singer Juanes. At the 2nd Annual Latin Grammy Awards, the album was nominated for Album of the Year while the song "Fijate Bien" was nominated for Record of the Year. In 2002, he worked again with Juanes as engineer working on Un Día Normal. At the 4th Annual Latin Grammy Awards, the album would go on to win Album of the Year with the song "Es Por Ti" winning Record of the Year. Additionally, Kerpel received nominations for his work with Molotov, these being for Record of the Year and Best Rock Album by a Duo or Group with Vocal, for "Frijolero" and Dance and Dense Denso respectively. In 2003, Kerpel participated in Café Tacvba's fourth album Cuatro Caminos. The album won the Grammy Award for Best Latin Rock/Alternative Performance at the 46th Annual Grammy Awards in 2004. The album also was nominated for Album of the Year at the 5th Annual Latin Grammy Awards, this being Kerpel's third nomination in the category. 

After also working on Mi Sangre (2004), Kerpel worked once again with Juanes as engineer for La Vida... Es Un Ratico (2007), receiving for a second time the Latin Grammy Award for Album of the Year. Since then, Kerpel has received several Latin Grammy Awards and nominations, including a nomination for Producer of the Year with Gustavo Santaolalla in 2015.

Kerpel has also worked as engineer and mixer on various occasions for film scores composed by Gustavo Santaolalla, including Amores Perros (2000), 21 Grams (2003), Babel (2006) and Biutiful (2011), all directed by Alejandro González Iñarritu, Walter Salles's The Motorcycle Diaries (2004) and Ang Lee's Brokeback Mountain (2005). Plus, he has collaborated on the music for the video game The Last of Us, also composed by Santaolalla.

Discography

(A) Album, (S), Single

Awards and nominations

Grammy Awards

Latin Grammy Awards

References

Argentine record producers
Latin music record producers
Living people
Year of birth missing (living people)